Giulia Moi (born 24 May 1971) is an Italian Member of the European Parliament for the Five Star Movement. She was elected in 2014.

She graduated with a degree in biology from the University of Cagliari and completed a PhD at King's College London entitled "Chemistry and Biological Activity of Kigelia pinnata Relevant to Skin Conditions".

She joined the Five Star Movement, with which she was elected at the 2014 European elections.

References

External links
 

1971 births
Living people
Alumni of King's College London
MEPs for Italy 2014–2019
21st-century women MEPs for Italy
Five Star Movement politicians
People from Cagliari
University of Cagliari alumni
Sardinian women